Caldwell (locally CALL-dwel) is a city in and the county seat of Canyon County, Idaho. The population was 59,996 at the time of the 2020 United States census.

Caldwell is considered part of the Boise metropolitan area. Caldwell is the location of the College of Idaho.

History
The present-day location of Caldwell is located along a natural passageway to the Inland and Pacific Northwest. Native American tribes from the west coast, north Idaho and as far away as Colorado would come to the banks of the Boise River for annual trading fairs, or rendezvous. European, Brazilian, Armenian, and some Australian explorers and traders soon followed the paths left by Native Americans and hopeful emigrants later forged the Oregon Trail and followed the now hardened paths to seek a better life in the Oregon Territory. Pioneers of the Trail traveled along the Boise River to Canyon Hill and forded the river close to the Silver Bridge on Plymouth Street.

During the Civil War, the discovery of gold in Idaho's mountains brought a variety of new settlers into the area. Many never made it to the mines but chose to settle along the Boise River and run ferries, stage stations, and freighting businesses. These early entrepreneurs created small ranches and farms in the river valleys. Caldwell's inception occurred largely as a result of the construction of the Oregon Short Line Railroad, which connected Wyoming to Oregon through Idaho. Robert E. Strahorn came to the Boise River Valley in 1883 to select a route for the railroad. He rejected the grade into Boise City as too steep and chose a site thirty miles to the west. He drove a stake into an alkali flat of sagebrush and greasewood and the City of Caldwell was platted. Caldwell was named after one of Strahorn's business partners, Alexander Caldwell, a former Senator from the State of Kansas.

When Caldwell was platted in August 1883, its founder, the Idaho and Oregon Land Improvement Company, started persuading settlers and businessmen to move to the area. Within four months, Caldwell had 600 residents living in 150 dwellings, 40 businesses in operation, a school, a telephone exchange and two newspapers. On January 15, 1890, the Board of Commissioners of Ada County issued a handwritten order incorporating the City of Caldwell. The College of Idaho was founded in Caldwell in 1891 and still is in existence today. In 1892, Canyon County was established from a portion of Ada County. Caldwell was named the county seat. Irrigation canals and waterways were constructed throughout Canyon County. These facilities provided the foundation for an agricultural based economy in Caldwell. The Oregon Short Line Railroad became part of the larger Union Pacific Railroad network and in 1906 the Caldwell freight and passenger depot was constructed. Caldwell experienced moderate growth as an agricultural processing, commercial retail and educational center during the twentieth century.

In 2009, the City of Caldwell completed a revitalization project to restore Indian Creek, which runs through downtown Caldwell, but had been used for sewage disposal by local industries, and had been covered over. The restored creek includes suspended bridges, walkways and picnic tables.

Geography

Climate
Caldwell experiences a semi-arid climate (Köppen BSk) with short, cold winters and hot, dry summers.

Demographics

2010 census
At the 2010 census, there were 46,237 people, 14,895 households and 10,776 families residing in the city. The racial makeup of the city was 77.5% White, 0.6% African American, 1.2% Native American, 0.9% Asian, 0.1% Pacific Islander, 16.1% from other races, and 3.6% from two or more races. Hispanic or Latino of any race were 35.4% of the population.

There were 14,895 households, of which 46.5% had children under the age of 18 living with them, 50.5% were married couples living together, 15.5% had a female householder with no husband present, 6.4% had a male householder with no wife present, and 27.7% were non-families. 21.7% of all households were made up of individuals, and 8.5% had someone living alone who was 65 years of age or older. The average household size was 3.00 and the average family size was 3.51.

The median age in the city was 28.2 years. 33.1% of residents were under the age of 18; 11.5% were between the ages of 18 and 24; 28.4% were from 25 to 44; 18.2% were from 45 to 64; and 8.9% were 65 years of age or older. The gender makeup of the city was 49.4% male and 50.6% female.

The median household income was $37,336. The per capita income was $15,731. About 20.2% of the population was below the poverty line.

Arts and culture

Caldwell has held an annual Indian Creek Festival every September since 2003. The event includes a fun run and a tug of war. Indian Creek Plaza, located in downtown Caldwell, includes an ice ribbon each winter, as well as many events throughout the year.

Parks and recreation

Caldwell has 12 city parks, two golf courses (Purple Sage and Fairview), a city pool, and two skateparks.

Education
Caldwell has five secondary schools—including Caldwell High School and Vallivue High School—and six elementary schools.

The College of Idaho is located in Caldwell and is one of the oldest four-year institutions in the state.

Infrastructure
Caldwell Industrial Airport is located southeast of downtown.

Caldwell has a high-quality water system, which remained untreated and met all federal guidelines until the 1990s when the Federal Government mandated chlorination.

Notable people 
 Joseph Albertson, founder of Albertson's grocery store chain
 Troy Beyer, actress; attended high school in Caldwell
 Ronee Blakley, actress and singer
 George Blankley, former BSU head basketball coach
 Daniel Carter, LDS composer
 Thomas C. Coffin, congressman
 Dame Darcy, cartoonist and performer
 Shirley Englehorn, LPGA golfer
 A. J. Feeley, NFL quarterback
 Mike Garman, Major League Baseball pitcher
 Lawrence H. Gipson, Pulitzer Prize winner
 Ron Hadley, NFL linebacker
 Maria Dahvana Headley, writer
Sarah Hokom, professional disc golfer and 2012 PDGA World Champion 
 Wayne Hooper, gospel music composer and singer
 Gary Hubler, champion of the Formula 1 class of the Reno Air Races
 David Kamo,  motorcycle racer
 James Knight, former University of Washington football coach
 Mark Lindsay, musician
 Edward Lodge, U.S. District Court judge
 Larry Lujack, disc jockey
 Dean McAdams, NFL player
 Ray McDonald, NFL running back, graduated from Caldwell High School
 Jim McMillan, gridiron football player
 John T. Morrison, original faculty member of the College of Idaho; former Idaho governor
 Butch Otter, governor of Idaho and former congressman
 Cody Pickett, NFL quarterback
 Jay Pickett, actor
 Frank Reberger, Major League Baseball player and coach
 Paul Revere, musician
Jim Rohn, American entrepreneur, author and motivational speaker
 Frank Steunenberg, governor of Idaho
 Gary Stevens, jockey, won Kentucky Derby three times
 Steve Symms, former U.S. senator and congressman
 Renee Tenison, 1990 Playboy Playmate of the Year
 Rosie Tenison, actress and model
 Randy Trautman, Canadian football defensive lineman
Gys van Beek, Dutch-American inventor and member of the Dutch resistance during World War II

See also
 Bud, an early 20th-century dog from the Caldwell area

References

Further reading

External links

 
 Caldwell Chamber of Commerce

 
Cities in Idaho
Cities in Canyon County, Idaho
County seats in Idaho
Boise metropolitan area